The Danbury Hat Tricks are a professional ice hockey team based in Danbury, Connecticut. The team is a member of the Federal Prospects Hockey League and plays at the Danbury Ice Arena.

History
The Danbury Hat Tricks were announced as a member of the Federal Prospects Hockey League on May 7, 2019. Former FHL player Billy McCreary was announced a general manager and head coach. The team is owned by DP 110 LLC, the same group that had recently purchased the Danbury Ice Arena. The first signings by the team were goaltender Jordan Brant and defenseman Kruz Listmayer. Listmayer is the nephew of Hat Tricks co-owner and former NHLer Colton Orr.

The Hat Tricks are the third FHL/FPHL team to have played in Danbury, the previous being the Whalers and Titans. The five stars in the Hat Tricks logo refer to the five previous professional teams to have played in the city; the others being the Trashers, Stars and Mad Hatters. Besides the obvious reference to the players that score three goals in a single game, the team's name pays tribute to Danbury being known as 'Hat City' due to its history at the center of the American hat industry.

During the team's inaugural season, Danbury was in first place in the Eastern Division when the league cancelled the rest of the season due to the COVID-19 pandemic. Billy McCreary stepped down as head coach after winning Coach of the Year to take the head coaching job with the North American Hockey League's (NAHL) Danbury Jr. Hat Tricks, but kept the general manager position with the FPHL team. Former Maine Mariners assistant coach Anthony Bohn was named head coach. The team opted out of the 2020–21 season entirely due to capacity restrictions in the arena during the pandemic. Before returning in the 2021–22 season, Bohn left to become the head coach of the NAHL's El Paso Rhinos and the Hat Tricks hired former Danbury Trashers captain Dave MacIsaac as head coach.

In the 2021-22 season, the Hat Tricks were among the league's best, but were swept in the second round to Columbus.

Following the season, McCreary was named Head Coach a second time, while also adding on President of Hockey Operations, replacing MacIsaac who went on to future endeavors.

Season-by-season results 

Source:

Awards

Forward of the Year 
 2019–20: Carter Shinkaruk
 2021–22: Jonny Ruiz

Defenseman of the Year 
 2019–20: Aaron Atwell
 2021–22: Steve Brown

Goaltender of the Year 
 2019–20: Tom McGuckin

Coach of the Year 
 2019–20: Billy McCreary

Founders' Award 
 2019–20: John Krupinsky
 2021–22: Billy McCreary

Broadcasters of the Year 
 2019–20: Casey Bryant, Jack O'Marra, Zak McGinniss

Goaltender of the Month 
 February 2019–20: Tom McGuckin

Franchise Leaders 

All-time and season leaders as of the 2021-22 season:

All-time regular season 
 Games played: Jonny Ruiz, 102
 Goals scored: Jonny Ruiz, 74
 Assists: Jonny Ruiz, 60
 Points: Jonny Ruiz, 134
 Penalty minutes: Dustin Jesseau, 154

All-time postseason 
 Games played: 13 different players, 5
 Goals scored: Steve Mele, 6
 Assists: Dmitry Kuznetsov, 4
 Points: Steve Mele & Jonny Ruiz, 7
 Penalty minutes: Dustin Jesseau, 34

All-time (including regular season & postseason) 
 Games played: Jonny Ruiz, 107
 Goals scored: Jonny Ruiz, 79
 Assists: Jonny Ruiz, 63
 Points: Jonny Ruiz, 141
 Penalty minutes: Dustin Jesseau, 188

Season records 
 Goals scored: Jonny Ruiz, 49 (2021-22)
 Assists: Carter Shinkaruk, 38 (2019-20)
 Points: Jonny Ruiz, 85 (2021-22)
 Penalty minutes: Dustin Jesseau, 154 (2021-22)

Postseason records 
 Goals scored: Steve Mele, 6 (2022)
 Assists:  Dmitry Kuznetsov, 4 (2022)
 Points: Steve Mele & Jonny Ruiz, 7 (2022)
 Penalty minutes: Dustin Jesseau, 34 (2022)

References

External links
 Danbury Hat Tricks

Federal Prospects Hockey League teams
Ice hockey clubs established in 2019
Ice hockey teams in Connecticut
2019 establishments in Connecticut
Danbury, Connecticut
Sports in Fairfield County, Connecticut